Ende Gelände 2020 was a mass action of civil disobedience of the wider movement for climate justice from 25 to 27 September 2020 in Rhineland, Germany, close to Cologne. It protested against Germany's climate politics, because it "is a complete failure and makes it impossible to keep global warming below 1.5 degrees. For the first time a protest against natural gas was included.

The "hygiene concept" was necessary because of the COVID-19 pandemic. Participant numbers were limited and dispersed among various smaller camps as opposed to the usual single large camp, in order to limit the size of gatherings. Organizers created an anonymized contact tracing system that allowed for public health protection while shielding the names of participants.

Actions taken by the around  protesters included the blockading of coal mines, train tracks transporting coal, the construction of a gas pipeline, as well as the operations of a gas power plant and a coal power plant. The action in 2020 was the first time Ende Gelände protesters targeted fossil gas infrastructure as part of a conscious effort to emphasize the message that fossil gas is not a sustainable substitute for coal power.

See also 
 Ende Gelände
 Ende Gelände 2019
 Ende Gelände 2021
 Extinction Rebellion (XR)
 School strike for climate / Fridays for Future (FFF)
 Energy transition (in Germany)
 Fossil fuel divestment
 Climate disobedience

References

External links
 Ende Gelände

Political history of Germany
Civil disobedience
Climate change
Protest marches
Climate justice
2020 in Germany
2020 in the environment
2020 protests